Sophia is an unincorporated community in central Randolph County in the U.S. state of North Carolina. It is located along U.S. Route 311, just northwest of the route's intersection with I-73/I-74/US 220 and southeast of Archdale.  The ZIP Code for Sophia is 27350.

References

Unincorporated communities in North Carolina
Unincorporated communities in Randolph County, North Carolina